A cellular architecture is a type of computer architecture prominent in parallel computing. Cellular architectures are relatively new, with IBM's Cell microprocessor being the first one to reach the market. Cellular architecture takes multi-core architecture design to its logical conclusion, by giving the programmer the ability to run large numbers of concurrent threads within a single processor. Each 'cell' is a compute node containing thread units, memory, and communication. Speed-up is achieved by exploiting thread-level parallelism inherent in many applications.

Cell, a cellular architecture containing 9 cores, is the processor used in the PlayStation 3. Another prominent cellular architecture is Cyclops64, a massively parallel architecture currently under development by IBM.  

Cellular architectures follow the low-level programming paradigm, which exposes the programmer to much of the underlying hardware. This allows the programmer to greatly optimize their code for the platform, but at the same time makes it more difficult to develop software.

External links
 Cellular architecture builds next generation supercomputers
 ORNL, IBM, and the Blue Gene Project
 Energy, IBM are partners in biological supercomputing project
 Cell-based Architecture

Parallel computing
Computer architecture
Classes of computers